Einar Tørnquist Johansen (born 23 June 1982) is a Norwegian drummer and talk-show host. He hosts the eponymous Tørnquist-show which is available from VG's, Norway's largest newspaper, web-TV. He also featured in the comedy late-night talk show Storbynatt, hosted by his friends Bård Tufte Johansen and Harald Eia, as a drummer for the houseband "Svidd gummi". The how aired for one season on NRK1.

Tørnquist hosts two popular podcasts: "Jan Thomas og Einar blir venner", with :no:Jan Thomas; and "198 land med Einar Tørnquist", with a different celebrity guest each week.

He was awarded as the best newcomer/breakthrough at the 2013 edition of Komiprisen.

He also appeared in the Norwegian edition of MasterChef, but did not make the final.

References

1982 births
Living people
Norwegian drummers
Male drummers
21st-century Norwegian drummers
21st-century Norwegian male musicians